Secret Story 7 is the seventh season of the French reality television series Secret Story, a show which is based loosely on the international Big Brother format. Casting for this season opened on 24 August 2012. The season began on 7 June 2013 and will finish airing on 13 September 2013, with all episodes airing on TF1, as in previous years. The format of Before Secret this season was alike the concept used in the fourth edition.

Benjamin Castaldi returned to host the main show and Adrien Lemaître returned to host the spin-off show After Secret, with Nadège Lacroix (winner of the sixth season of the show) as his new co-host.

Housemates

Alexia 
 Alexia secret is: "I lived 14 years with my paralyzed twin". She entered on Day 3. She finished in third place on Day 101.

Anaïs 
 Anaïs is 25. She comes from Marseille, France and shares her secret with Ben, Julien and Sonia : "We are family of viewers". She entered on Day 1. She won the series on Day 101.

Ben 
 Ben is 48. He shares his secret with Anaïs, Julien and Sonia : "We are family of viewers". He entered on Day 1. He walked on Day 21.

Clara 
 Clara secret is that she is the daughter of an 80's artist. She entered on Day 3. She was evicted on Day 87.

Eddy 
 Eddy is a male/female model. He entered on Day 3. He was evicted on Day 73.

Émilie 
 Émilie is a private detective. She entered on Day 3. She was evicted on Day 66.

Florine 
 Florine has the ability of communicating with animals as secret. She entered on Day 3. She was evicted on Day 94.

Gautier 
 Gautier is "the common secret of the housemates" therefore he is the solution to the first mystery of the seven this season. He entered on Day 3. He became the runner up on Day 101.

Guillaume 
 Guillaume secret is that he "sold himself on the Internet". He entered on Day 3. He was evicted on Day 59.

 Jamel 
 Jamel is 23. He lives in UK and his secret is : "I grew up in a slum". He entered on Day 3. He was evicted on Day 52.

 Julien 
 Julien is 21. He is a model and shares his secret with Anaïs, Ben and Sonja : "We are family of viewers". He entered on Day 1. He was evicted on Day 94.

 Mickaël 
 Mickaël secret: "I survived to a shark attack". He entered on Day 3. He was evicted on Day 10.

 Morgane 
 Morgane shares her secret with Sabrina and their secret is : "We are twins". She entered on Day 10. She was evicted on Day 31.

 Sabrina 
 Sabrina shares her secret with Morgane and their secret is : "We are twins". She entered on Day 3. She was evicted on Day 38.

 Sonja 
 Sonja is 36. She shares her secret with Anaïs, Ben and Julien : "We are family of viewers". She entered on Day 1. She was evicted on Day 45.

 Tara 
 Tara is 22. She is a beautician and shares her secret with Vincent : "We are the masters of the nominations". She entered on Day 3. She was evicted on Day 17.

 Vincent 
 Vincent shares his secret with Tara: "We are the masters of the nominations". He entered on Day 3. He finished in fourth place on Day 101.

 Houseguests 

 Amélie 
 Amélie Neten participated to Secret Story 4 in 2010. She entered in this season as a guest on Day 80, on the Secret House and quit on Day 87.

 Daniel 
 Daniel MKongo participated to Secret Story 5 in 2011 with the secret to be a fake couple with Ayem. He entered in this season as a guest on Day 87 and qui on Day 92.

 Julien 
 Julien participated to Secret Story 6 in 2012. He entered in this season as a guest on Day 87 and quit on Day 92.

 Marie 
 Marie Garet, winner of Secret Story 5 in 2011, entered in this season as a guest on Day 80, on the Secret Room with Vincent and Stephanie. On Day 83, she join the Secret House and quit on Day 87.

 Stéphanie 
 Stéphanie Clerbois, finalist of Secret Story 4 in 2010, entered in this season as a guest on Day 80, on the Secret Room with Vincent. On Day 85, Stephanie and Vincent join the Secret House as a couple. On Day 87, La Voix'' announce that Stepahnie can continue one more week his relation with Vincent, she quit the House on Day 92.

Secrets

Weekly summary

Nominations Table

Notes

Nominations totals received 

 Automatically nominated.
 Not Eligible to be up for eviction.
 Not in House.
 No nominations.

Nominations : Results

Ratings

Prime time

After Secret

Live

References

External links 
  Official website for Secret Story
 Big brother news site

2013 French television seasons
07